The King's Canadian Hussars were a cavalry regiment of the Non-Permanent Active Militia of the Canadian Militia (now the Canadian Army). In August 1939, the regiment was converted to artillery and currently exists today as the 87th Field Battery, RCA.

Lineage 

 Originated on 12 June 1874, in Kentville, Nova Scotia as the King's Canadian Hussars.
 Organized on 1 December 1903, as a full regiment.
 Reorganized on 1 April 1904, as the 14th King's Canadian Hussars.
 Redesignated on 15 March 1920, as The King's (Nova Scotia) Mounted Rifles.
 Redesignated on 1 December 1925, as the King's Canadian Hussars.
 Amalgamated on 1 December 1936, with C Company of The Colchester and Hants Regiment and B Company of the 6th Machine Gun Battalion, CMGC and Redesignated as the King's Canadian Hussars (Armoured Car).
 Converted on 1 August 1939, from Light Armour to Artillery and Formed the 87th Field Battery, RCA and the 88th Field Battery, RCA.

Perpetuations

The Great War 

 6th Regiment, Canadian Mounted Rifles
The King's Canadian Hussars were first granted the perpetuation of the 6th Regiment, Canadian Mounted Rifles after the First World War. After the regiment was converted to artillery in 1939, the perpetuation was continued by the 8th Canadian Hussars (Princess Louise's) that continues this to the present day.

History

King's Canadian Hussars

Early History 
The King's Canadian Hussars were first authorized on 12 June 1874. On 1 December 1903, the Hussars were organized as a full regiment.

They were reorganized on 1 April 1904, as the 14th King's Canadian Hussars.

The First World War 
On 7 November 1914, the 6th Regiment, Canadian Mounted Rifles was authorized and on 17 July 1915, the regiment embarked for the United Kingdom. On 24 October 1915, the 6th Regiment, CMR disembarked in France where it continued to train until early 1916. On 2 January 1916, the Canadian Mounted Rifles regiments were converted to infantry and the personnel from the 6th CMR were absorbed by the 4th Battalion, Canadian Mounted Rifles and 5th Battalion, Canadian Mounted Rifles of the 8th Canadian Infantry Brigade, 3rd Canadian Division. On 18 February 1918, the 6th Regiment, CMR was disbanded.

1920s-1930s 
On 15 March 1920, as a result of the Post-WWI Canadian Militia Reforms following the Otter Commission, the 14th King's Canadian Hussars were Redesignated as The King's (Nova Scotia) Mounted Rifles.

On 1 December 1925, they were again Redesignated as the King's Canadian Hussars.

On 1 December 1936, as part of the 1936 Canadian Militia Reorganization, the King's Canadian Hussars were Amalgamated with "C" Company of The Colchester and Hants Regiment and "B" Company of the 6th Machine Gun Battalion, CMGC and Redesignated as the King's Canadian Hussars (Armoured Car).

On 15 August 1939, the King's Canadian Hussars were converted from Light Armour to Artillery and became the 87th Field Battery, RCA and the 88th Field Battery, RCA respectively.

87th Field Battery, RCA

Second World War 
First serving as part of the 14th Field Artillery Regiment, RCA, the 87th Field Battery was placed on active service and on 26 January 1942, became the 87th Medium Battery, part of the 3rd Medium Regiment, RCA.

After first serving in England with the I Canadian Corps, the 87th Medium Battery along with the rest of the 3rd Medium Regiment were transferred to the II Canadian Corps and served in Northwest Europe until later being assigned to the Artillery Group of the First Canadian Army.

On 16 November 1945, The 87th Medium Battery was disbanded and the 87th Field Battery returned to being a reserve unit.

Post-War 
After having served as a reserve Anti-Aircraft Battery in Dartmouth since 1946, on 1 November 1960, the 87th Battery was again converted back to field artillery under the name 87th Field Battery, RCA and assigned to the 1st (Halifax-Dartmouth) Field Artillery Regiment, RCA.

Battle Honours 

 Mount Sorrell
 Somme, 1916
 France And Flanders, 1915-16

Notable Members 

 Major Harold Lothrop Borden

See Also 

 List of regiments of cavalry of the Canadian Militia (1900–1920)

References 

Hussar regiments of Canada
Military regiments raised in Nova Scotia
Military units and formations of Nova Scotia
British colonial regiments
Military units and formations established in 1874